Francesco Onofrio Manfredini (22 June 1684 – 6 October 1762) was an Italian Baroque composer, violinist, and church musician.

He was born at Pistoia to a trombonist.  He studied violin with Giuseppe Torelli in Bologna, then a part of the Papal States, a leading figure in the development of the concerto grosso.  He also took instruction in composition from Giacomo Antonio Perti, maestro di cappella of the Basilica of San Petronio from 1696 when the orchestra was temporarily disbanded.

Much of his music is presumed to have been destroyed after his death; only 43 published works and a handful of manuscripts are known. To quote his Naxos biography, "His groups of Concerti Grossi and Sinfonias show a highly accomplished composer, well versed in the mainstream Italian school of composition."

Career
Although he composed oratorios, only his secular works remain in the repertoire.  A contemporary of Johann Sebastian Bach and Antonio Vivaldi, his extant work shows the influence of the latter.

He became a violinist, c. 1700, in the orchestra of the Church of San Spirito in Ferrara.  In 1704, however, he returned to Bologna, employed again in the re-formed orchestra of San Petronio.  He became a member of the Accademia Filarmonica in the same year he published his first compositions, a set of twelve chamber sonatas he named Concertini per camera, Op. 1.  In 1709, he also published Sinfonie da chiesa, Op. 2; ostensibly chamber pieces, they, in fact, complemented the earlier chamber sonatas.

After 1711, Manfredini spent an extended stay in Monaco, apparently in the service of Prince Antoine I. The prince had been a pupil of Louis XIV's favorite composer Jean Baptiste Lully, whose conductor's baton he had inherited.  The precise nature of his relationship to the court of Monaco, and the length of his stay, are not known.  Manfredini is first mentioned in court records in 1712.  In 1718 he would publish, in Bologna, his Concerti Grossi for two violins and basso continuo, Op. 3, Nos. 1–12 which is dedicated to that ruler. Also copies of his Sinfonie, Op. 2 were found in the princely library.  One indication of the nature of the relationship is that Prince Antoine stood as godfather to Manfredini's son Antonio Francesco; four other children were born to him during his stay in the principality.

Given even this slim evidence, it can be inferred that both parties were satisfied by the arrangement since the composer does not reappear in the historical records until the year 1727, when he had returned to Pistoia as maestro di cappella at St. Phillip's Cathedral, a post he would hold until his death in 1762.

The Naxos label has released a 1991 recording of the Opus 3 (catalog number: 8.553891), recorded by the Slovakian Capella Istropolitana, conducted by Jaroslav Krček.  The liner notes further suggest that his name "may have...disappeared had he not composed a Christmas Concerto (No. 12 of Op. 3).... [T]hese concerti grossi...demonstrate a gift for easy melodic invention."

Two of his sons, Vincenzo and Giuseppe, had careers of some note.  The former was appointed maestro di cappella of the Italian opera in St. Petersburg.  Giuseppe became a castrato singer.

References

External links

F. Manfredini from 'Tesori Musicali Toscani'

1684 births
1762 deaths
18th-century Italian composers
18th-century Italian male musicians
Classical composers of church music
Italian Baroque composers
Italian classical violinists
Italian male classical composers
Male classical violinists
People from Pistoia